Yongtongqiao, better known as Baliqiao (also romanised as Palikao), is a historic bridge located at the intersection of Tongzhou and Chaoyang districts in the east of  Beijing, China. It passes over the Tonghui River (通惠河).

History

The exact origins of the bridge are difficult to discern. While the bridge's current structure dates back to the late Ming dynasty, historical records indicate that there was already a bridge at the site since around the fourth century CE.

The bridge is located exactly eight li (Chinese mile) from Tongzhou District in Beijing, hence it was called "Baliqiao" or "Eight Mile Bridge". It was once used as a marker of the outer boundary of the Imperial City of Beijing, beyond which was the former Zhili province.

A small palace and temple complex once stood near the bridge. When the Emperor travelled out of the Imperial City, he alighted from his jiao at the complex and rested there overnight before changing out of his elaborate imperial robes to plainer attire suited for travelling. When he returned from his trip, he stayed overnight at the complex again and changed back to his imperial robes before entering the Imperial City again.

The canal over which the bridge stands is connected to the Summer Palace. The Qianlong Emperor of the Qing dynasty started his six boat tours to the Jiangnan region from the bridge.

Battle of Baliqiao

During the Second Opium War in 1860, on the morning of 21 September, a combined Anglo-French force that had recently occupied Tianjin engaged a Chinese army numbering some 30,000 strong at Baliqiao. A fierce battle ensued, with the Anglo-French force inflicting massive losses on the Chinese army and invading Beijing thereafter. Historians estimate the losses on the Chinese side as about 1,200. The French and British, in contrast, lost only five soldiers. The French troops were led by Charles Guillaume Cousin-Montauban, who was then awarded the title Count of Palikao by Napoléon III.

It was at the bridge where the Chinese imperial commissioners agreed to all the demands put forth by the British and French, including the payment of reparations and acceptance of foreign diplomats at the imperial court in Beijing.

Baliqiao at present
Baliqiao currently stands at the juncture of the districts of Chaoyang and Tongzhou, and has a subway station served by the Line Batong of the Beijing Subway. The Jingtong Expressway runs through the suburb. 

A pavilion built in Qing dynasty style has been recently erected to protect the stelae with the Qianlong Emperor's calligraphy from the elements.

Nothing presently remains of the small temple and palace complex, but its location has been identified, and archaeologists are applying for permission to investigate the hitherto undisturbed site.

At present, Baliqiao is in a somewhat neglected state, with graffiti and assorted bills marring its marble construction. Some of its surviving lion sculptures (similar to the lions decorating Lugou Bridge) have been damaged in recent years. There are plans to build a new bridge in order to divert road traffic from the bridge, permitting restoration and conservation work to be carried out, and restricting access to the bridge to all but pedestrian traffic. A museum for the bridge and site is also planned.

External links

Road transport in Beijing
Bridges in Beijing
Ming dynasty